Kathleen Mary Williams (born 1956) is United States district judge of the United States District Court for the Southern District of Florida. She previously served as the Federal Public Defender for the Southern District of Florida.

Early life and education
Williams graduated from Duke University with her Bachelor of Arts magna cum laude in History, in 1978 and from the University of Miami School of Law with a Juris Doctor in 1982.

Legal career
Following law school graduation, Williams became a law clerk for the firm of Colson & Hicks, P.A. in Miami, Florida from 1980 – 1982. From 1982 – 1984 she was an associate attorney with Fowler, White, Burnett, Hurley, Banick & Strickroot where she handled many aspects of insurance defense matters including legal research and writing, filing and arguing pretrial motions, and taking depositions. In 1984, Williams was an Assistant United States Attorney for the Southern District of Florida where she prosecuted more than 50 defendants in over 20 jury trials, including two litigations involving the first Colombian defendants extradited to the United States on money laundering charges and one involving the Ochoa drug cartel. Williams was in this position until 1988. Williams became an associate attorney for the firm of Morgan, Lewis & Bockius from 1988–1990 and focused on white collar criminal defense. Between 1990 and 1995, she became the Chief Assistant Federal Public Defender for the Southern District of Florida. Williams acted as lead attorney or co-counsel in approximately ten trials in defense of clients charged with crimes ranging from firearms violations to bank fraud. In 1995, Williams became the Federal Public Defender for the Southern District of Florida where she managed and directed the work of 48 Assistant Federal Defenders, 16 investigators, and over 50 support staff. Her responsibilities included all aspects of federal criminal litigation in diverse matters including immigration, narcotics trafficking, securities fraud, and terrorism cases. In 1999, at the request of the Chief Judge of the Eleventh Circuit, Williams became the Acting Federal Public Defender  for the United States District Court for the Middle District of Florida while continuing to serve as the Defender for the Southern District of Florida.

Federal judicial service
On July 21, 2010, President Barack Obama nominated Williams to replace United States District Judge Daniel T. K. Hurley on the United States District Court for the Southern District of Florida. The United States Senate confirmed Williams by unanimous consent on August 2, 2011. She received her judicial commission on August 4, 2011.

References

External links

1956 births
Living people
Assistant United States Attorneys
Duke University alumni
Judges of the United States District Court for the Southern District of Florida
People from Derby, Connecticut
Public defenders
United States district court judges appointed by Barack Obama
University of Miami School of Law alumni
21st-century American judges
21st-century American women judges